The most common name for the American Civil War in modern American usage is simply "The Civil War". Although rarely used during the war, the term "War Between the States" became widespread afterward in the Southern United States. During and immediately after the war, Northern historians often used the terms "War of the Rebellion" and "Great Rebellion", and the Confederate term was "War for Southern Independence", which regained some currency in the 20th century but has again fallen out of use. The name "Slaveholders' Rebellion" was used by Frederick Douglass and appears in newspaper articles. "Freedom War" is used to celebrate the war's effect of ending slavery.

During the Jim Crow era of the 1950s, the term "War of Northern Aggression" developed under the Lost Cause of the Confederacy movement by Southern historical revisionists or negationists. This label was coined by segregationists in an effort to equate contemporary efforts to end segregation with 19th-century efforts to abolish slavery.

Several names also exist for the forces on each side; the opposing forces named battles differently as well. The Union forces frequently named battles for bodies of water that were prominent on or near the battlefield, but Confederates most often used the name of the nearest town. As a result, many battles have two or more names that have had varying use, but with some notable exceptions, one name has eventually tended to take precedence.

Enduring names

Civil War
In the United States, "Civil War" is the most common term for the conflict and has been used by the overwhelming majority of reference books, scholarly journals, dictionaries, encyclopedias, popular histories, and mass media in the United States since the early 20th century. The National Park Service, the government organization entrusted by the US Congress to preserve the battlefields of the war, uses this term. Writings of prominent men such as Jefferson Davis, Robert E. Lee, Ulysses S. Grant, William Tecumseh Sherman, P. G. T. Beauregard, Nathan Bedford Forrest, and Judah P. Benjamin used the term "Civil War" during the conflict. Abraham Lincoln used it on multiple occasions. In 1862, the US Supreme Court used the terms "the present civil war between the United States and the so called Confederate States" and "the civil war such as that now waged between the Northern and Southern States."

English-language historians outside the United States usually refer to the conflict as the "American Civil War". Such variations are also used in the United States if the war might otherwise be confused with another civil war such as the English Civil War, the Russian Civil War, or the Spanish Civil War.

War Between the States

The term "War Between the States" was rarely used during the war but became prevalent afterward among proponents of the "Lost Cause" interpretation of the war.

The Confederate government avoided the term "civil war," which assumes both combatants to be part of a single country, and so referred to it in official documents as the "War between the Confederate States of America and the United States of America." European diplomacy produced a similar formula for avoiding the phrase "civil war." Queen Victoria's proclamation of British neutrality referred to "hostilities... between the Government of the United States of America and certain States styling themselves the Confederate States of America."

After the war, the memoirs of former Confederate officials and veterans (Joseph E. Johnston, Raphael Semmes, and especially Alexander Stephens) commonly used the term "War Between the States." In 1898, the United Confederate Veterans formally endorsed the name. In the early 20th century, the United Daughters of the Confederacy (UDC) led a campaign to promote the term "War Between the States" in the media and public schools. UDC efforts to convince the US Congress to adopt the term began in 1913 but were unsuccessful. Congress has never adopted an official name for the war. The name "War Between the States" is inscribed on the USMC War Memorial at Arlington National Cemetery. The name was personally ordered by Lemuel C. Shepherd Jr., the 20th Commandant of the Marine Corps.

Franklin D. Roosevelt referred to the Civil War as "the four-year War Between the States." References to the "War Between the States" appear occasionally in federal and state court documents, including in Justice Harry Blackmun's landmark opinion in Roe v. Wade. Their usage demonstrates the generality of the term's use. Roosevelt was born and raised in New York State, and Blackmun was born in southern Illinois but grew up in St. Paul, Minnesota.

The names "Civil War" and "War Between the States" have been used jointly in some formal contexts. For example, to mark the war's centenary in the 1960s, the State of Georgia created the "Georgia Civil War Centennial Commission Commemorating the War Between the States." In 1994, the US Postal Service issued a series of commemorative stamps, "The Civil War: The War Between the States".

Historical terms in United States

War of the Rebellion

During and immediately after the war, US officials, Southern Unionists, and pro-Union writers often referred to Confederates as "Rebels." The earliest histories published in the northern states commonly refer to the war as "the Great Rebellion" or "the War of the Rebellion," as do many war monuments, hence the nicknames Johnny Reb (and Billy Yank) for the participants.

Frederick Douglass delivered a speech entitled "The Slaveholders' Rebellion" on 4 July 1862 in Himrod, New York, and John Harvey wrote The slaveholders' rebellion, and the downfall of slavery in America in 1865.
 More than 7000 newspaper articles used the term "The Slaveholders' Rebellion" between 1860 and 1900.

The official US war records refer to the war as the "War of the Rebellion." The records were compiled by the US War Department in a 127-volume collection, The War of the Rebellion: a Compilation of the Official Records of the Union and Confederate Armies, which was published from 1881 to 1901. Historians commonly refer to the collection as the Official Records.

War of Separation/Secession
"War of Separation" was occasionally used by people in the Confederacy during the war. In most Romance languages, the words used to refer to the war translate literally to "War of Secession", a name that is also used in 

War for Southern Independence/Second American Revolution
The "War for Southern Independence," the "Second American Revolution," and their variations are names used by some Southerners to refer to the war. That terminology aims to parallel usage of the American Revolutionary War.  While popular on the Confederate side during the war (Stonewall Jackson regularly referred to the war as the "second war for independence"), the term lost popularity in the immediate aftermath of the Confederacy's defeat and its failure to gain independence. The term resurfaced slightly in the late 20th century.

A popular poem published in the early stages of hostilities was South Carolina. Its prologue referred to the war as the "Third War for Independence" since it named the War of 1812 as the second such war. On November 8, 1860, the Charleston Mercury, a contemporary southern newspaper, stated, "The tea has been thrown overboard. The Revolution of 1860 has been initiated."

In the 1920s, the historian Charles A. Beard used the term "Second American Revolution" to emphasize the changes brought on by the Union's victory. The term is still used by the Sons of Confederate Veterans organization but with the intent to represent the Confederacy's cause positively.

War for the Union
Some Southern Unionists and northerners used "The War for the Union," the title of a December 1861 lecture by the abolitionist leader Wendell Phillips.

Ordeal of the Union, a major eight-volume history published from 1947 to 1971 by the historian and journalist (Joseph) Allan Nevins, emphasizes the Union in the first volume's title, which also came to name the series. Because Nevins earned the Bancroft, Scribner, and National Book Award Prizes for books in his Ordeal of the Union series, his title may have been influential. However, the fourth volume is titled Prologue to Civil War, 1859-1861, and the next four volumes use "War" in their titles. The sixth volume, War Becomes Revolution, 1862–1863, picks up on that earlier thread in naming the conflict, but Nevins neither viewed Southern secession as revolutionary nor supported Southern apologist attempts to link the war with the American Revolution of 1775–1783. If anything, his choice of the term in regard to the Civil War has more to do with the Industrial Revolution and its profound effects.

War of Northern/Yankee Aggression
The name "War of Northern Aggression" has been used to indicate the Union as the belligerent party in the war. The name arose during the Jim Crow era of the 1950s when it was coined by segregationists who tried to equate contemporary efforts to end segregation with 19th-century efforts to abolish slavery. The name has been criticized by historians such as James M. McPherson, as the Confederacy "took the initiative by seceding in defiance of an election of a president by a constitutional majority" and "started the war by firing on the American flag."

Since the free states and most non-Yankee groups (Germans, Dutch-Americans, New York Irish and southern-leaning settlers in Ohio, Indiana, and Illinois) showed opposition to waging the Civil War, other Confederate sympathizers have used the name "War of Yankee Aggression" to indicate the Civil War as a Yankee war, not a Northern war per se.

Conversely, the "War of Southern Aggression" has been used by those who assert that the Confederacy was the belligerent party. They maintain that the Confederacy started the war by initiating combat at Fort Sumter.

Miscellaneous
Other names for the conflict include "The Confederate War," "Buchanan's War," "Mr. Lincoln's War," and "Mr. Davis's War."  In 1892, a D.C. society of war-era nurses took on the name National Association of Army Nurses of the Late War, with "late" meaning simply "recent". More euphemistic terms are "The Late Unpleasantness" and "The Recent Unpleasantness." Other postwar names in the South included "The War of the Sections" and "The Brothers' War," especially in the border states.

Names of battles and armies

There is a disparity between the sides in naming some of the battles of the war. The Union forces frequently named battles for bodies of water or other natural features that were prominent on or near the battlefield, but Confederates most often used the name of the nearest town or artificial landmark. The historian Shelby Foote explained that many Northerners were urban and regarded bodies of water as noteworthy, but many Southerners were rural and regarded towns as noteworthy. That caused many battles to have two widely-used names.

However, not all of the disparities are based on those naming conventions. Many modern accounts of Civil War battles use the names established by the North. However, for some battles, the Southern name has become the standard. The National Park Service occasionally uses the Southern names for its battlefield parks located in the South, such as Manassas and Shiloh. In general, naming conventions were determined by the victor of the battle. Examples of battles with dual names are shown in the table.

Civil War armies were also named in a manner reminiscent of the battlefields since Northern armies were frequently named for major rivers (Army of the Potomac, Army of the Tennessee, Army of the Mississippi), and Southern armies for states or geographic regions (Army of Northern Virginia, Army of Tennessee, Army of Mississippi).

Units smaller than armies were named differently in many cases. Corps were usually written out (First Army Corps or simply First Corps), but a postwar convention developed to designate Union corps by using Roman numerals (XI Corps). Often, particularly with Southern armies, corps were more commonly known by the name of the leader (Hardee's Corps, Polk's Corps).

Union brigades were given numeric designations (1st, 2nd, etc.), but Confederate brigades were frequently named after their commanding general (Hood's Brigade, Gordon's Brigade). Confederate brigades so named retained the name of the original commander even when they were commanded temporarily by another man; for example, at the Battle of Gettysburg, Hoke's Brigade was commanded by Isaac Avery and Nicholl's Brigade by Jesse Williams. Nicknames were common in both armies, such as the Iron Brigade and the Stonewall Brigade.

Union artillery batteries were generally named numerically and Confederate batteries by the name of the town or county in which they were recruited (Fluvanna Artillery). Again, they were often simply referred to by their commander's name (Moody's Battery, Parker's Battery).

See also
Names from the War
Second American Civil War#1861–1865 war as Second American Civil War
Second American Revolution
Names of the United States

Notes

Further reading
 Catton, Bruce, The Coming Fury: The Centennial History of the Civil War, Volume 1, Doubleday, 1961, 
 Coski, John M., "The War between the Names", North and South magazine, vol. 8, no. 7., January 2006.
 Musick, Michael P., "Civil War Records: A War by Any Other Name", Prologue: Quarterly of the National Archives, Summer 1995, Vol. 27, No. 2.
 US War Department, The War of the Rebellion: a Compilation of the Official Records of the Union and Confederate Armies, US Government Printing Office, 1880–1901.
 Wittichen, Mrs. Murray Forbes, "Let's Say 'War Between the States'", Florida Division, United Daughters of the Confederacy, 1954.

External links
 National Park Service
 Civil War Battle Names
 Declaration of Causes of the Seceding States
 Naming of the war
Video of veteran calling it the "War of the Rebellion"

Historiography of the American Civil War
American Civil
American Civil
Lost Cause of the Confederacy